Three Weeks may refer to: 

 The Three Weeks, a period of mourning commemorating the destruction of both the first and second Jewish Temples in Judaism

Arts and entertainment
 Three Weeks (book), an early example of mass-market women's erotic fiction by Elinor Glyn
 Three Weeks, a 1914 film presented by B. S. Moss
 Three Weeks (film), a 1924 film drama directed by Alan Crosland, based on the Glyn book
 ThreeWeeks, a magazine that covers the Edinburgh Festivals
 "Three Weeks", a song on the album Polka Party with Brave Combo: Live and Wild! by Brave Combo